For the First Time in Forever: A Frozen Sing-Along Celebration is a musical show based on Disney's 2013 3D computer-animated musical feature film Frozen and the songs from the film, located at Disney's Hollywood Studios and Shanghai Disneyland Park. It was also formerly hosted at Disney California Adventure, Disneyland Park in Paris, and Hong Kong Disneyland.

Disney's Hollywood Studios version
The show originally premiered at the Premiere Theater in the Streets of America section of Disney's Hollywood Studios during the 2014 Frozen Summer Fun on July 5, 2014. The show moved into its current location at the Hyperion Theater in Echo Lake on June 17, 2015, the former home of The American Idol Experience.

On July 25, 2020, since Walt Disney World reopened due to COVID-19 pandemic, all stage show such as Finding Nemo - The Musical, Indiana Jones Epic Stunt Spectacular, Beauty and the Beast Live on Stage, and Festival of the Lion King had not returned due to a dispute between the Actors' Equity Association and Walt Disney World.

On September 26, 2020, For the First Time in Forever: A Frozen Sing-along Celebration returned to Disney's Hollywood Studios as reopening on October 5, 2020.

Disney California Adventure version
On January 7, 2015, the Muppet*Vision 3D theater in Hollywood Land at Disney California Adventure began operating as the Crown Jewel Theater and presented the show as part of the park's "Frozen Fun" event. Although the event officially ended on May 15, 2015, the venue held the Frozen sing-along show until April 17, 2016. It was then closed and the theater was renamed the Sunset Showcase Theater with a movie preview in May 2016. Since April 2019, the Sunset Showcase Theater began showing Mickey's PhilharMagic.

Disneyland Paris version
The stage is located in The Chaparral Theater in Frontierland under the name Chantons La Reine des Neiges; it is the first version that features Olaf. Shows run several times daily with separate French- and English-language presentations.  It first ran from June 1 to September 13, 2015 as the summer event, but it was scheduled to return on November 14, as part of the Christmas event. However, due to a terrorist attack in Paris on November 13, 2015, both Disneyland Paris and Walt Disney Studios Park were closed from November 14 until November 18.

Hong Kong Disneyland version
Hong Kong Disneyland features an almost identical show, named simply Frozen Festival Show. The stage is located in the "Black Box" space known as "The Pavilion", between Adventureland and Grizzly Gulch, also the former home of "The Revenge of the Headless Horseman", an exclusive walk-through attraction for the Haunted Halloween event from 2011-2014. It was run from June 11, 2015. Although the event officially ended on August 30, the show continued until October 4.

Shanghai Disneyland version
The stage is located in The Evergreen Playhouse in Fantasyland.  This was the first Frozen sing-along show that would not open for a seasonal event. In November 2019, it featured songs from the sequel, Frozen II.

Notes

References

External links

Walt Disney World Official Website
Shanghai Disneyland Official Website

Frozen (franchise)
Walt Disney Parks and Resorts entertainment
Disney California Adventure
Disney's Hollywood Studios
Disneyland Park (Paris)
Hong Kong Disneyland
Shanghai Disneyland
Hollywood Land
Echo Lake (Disney)
Frontierland
Fantasyland
2014 establishments in Florida
2015 establishments in California
2016 disestablishments in California
2015 establishments in France
2018 disestablishments in France
2015 establishments in Hong Kong
2015 disestablishments in Hong Kong
2016 establishments in China
Sing-along